Ștefan Vodă is a commune in Călărași County, Muntenia, Romania. It is composed of a single village, Ștefan Vodă.

References

Communes in Călărași County
Localities in Muntenia